Cui Yongmei (born 23 January 1969) is a Chinese former volleyball player who competed in the 1988 Summer Olympics and in the 1996 Summer Olympics.

References

1969 births
Living people
Chinese women's volleyball players
Olympic volleyball players of China
Volleyball players at the 1988 Summer Olympics
Volleyball players at the 1996 Summer Olympics
Olympic silver medalists for China
Olympic bronze medalists for China
Olympic medalists in volleyball
Asian Games medalists in volleyball
Volleyball players at the 1994 Asian Games
Medalists at the 1996 Summer Olympics
Medalists at the 1988 Summer Olympics
Medalists at the 1994 Asian Games
Asian Games silver medalists for China
20th-century Chinese women